The West Bay Athletic League is a high school athletic conference established in 2002 as part of the CIF Central Coast Section of the California Interscholastic Federation.  It comprises twelve private high schools generally around San Mateo County and Santa Clara County, California. One member, Mercy High School of San Francisco is in San Francisco.

History
The West Bay Athletic League was formed in 2002 from a realignment of the Private School Athletic League. Since its formation, it was expanded in 2008 to offer coed sports and two divisions, Foothill and Skyline.

Sports

Notes

Members
Certain member schools also compete in the Peninsula Athletic League for selected sports.

References

CIF Central Coast Section